Richard Scarry's Busytown is a 1993 educational video game that was developed by Novotrade for preschool gamers. It was released for DOS, Macintosh, and Sega Genesis. This game was based on the series of Best...Ever! series of VHSes distributed by Random House's home video division preceding the TV series' The Busy World of Richard Scarry that was produced by CINAR and Paramount Television. It was remade in 1999 by Pearson Software for Microsoft Windows (95 and later) and Mac OS (System 7.5.1 and later), with the visuals and animation updated to resemble that of The Busy World of Richard Scarry, and the dialogue re-recorded with Boston actors.

Gameplay
The game consists of an interactive storybook that was written by Richard Scarry. Most of the game is spent discovering Busytown looking for things to interact with using either the game pad or a special mouse that could be purchased separately from the game and the console system.

Young gamers will do everything from building a house using construction tools to delivering something to repair a ship. Games are relatively short and can be finished in about an hour. Familiar faces from Richard Scarry's works of literature include Huckle Cat and Lowly Worm. Another game allows players to control the wind in order to cause controlled havoc at the Busytown park and beach. Other games located throughout Busytown include helping finish Mr. Fix-it's latest invention, helping a patient at Dr. Diane's hospital, delivering goods throughout Busytown, helping Smokey the Firefighter prepare a fire engine for extinguishing a house fire, work at a gas station, fill orders at an automated deli, learn basic addition/subtraction on a see-saw, and help Bananas Gorilla get his box of bananas out of a park full of tourists. All games offer basic vocabulary practice as simple puzzles help improve basic problem solving and English language skills.

The voice quality of this game is realistic when compared to the cartoons of that era. All of the characters act and talk like their counterparts in the books and the animated series. If the player puts too much lemonade or soda in the glass and spills some out of the glass, then one of the characters may ask the player "Are you blind?" in a gentle voice. Delivering stuff allows the town to slowly come to life. The Sega version omits the Mr. Fix-it, Dr. Diane, gas station, see saw and Bananas Gorilla portions of the game.

Sequel and remake
There was a sequel for this game titled Richard Scarry's How Things Work in Busytown which received a 1994 North American exclusive release from Novotrade and Simon & Schuster. Like the original game, it is intended for a pre-kindergarten through second grade audience and was released for DOS in addition to the Macintosh. Children that play this game learn to assemble machinery, bake bread, and complete other processes that are necessary to live life. This game makes kids think where food comes from, how bread is baked, and so on. Different outcomes can be observed through the several different learning methods. Young players can also learn vocabulary, word recognition, and sequencing.

The original Busytown video game was remade in 1999 by Simon & Schuster Software, Pearson Software and Boston Animation. It was released for the Microsoft Windows and Macintosh operating systems, and featured improved voice acting, graphics and animation resembling The Busy World of Richard Scarry animated series, with an instrumental cover of the show's theme song playing over the game's credits. The gameplay is still the same and the original songs from the 1993 release are included. However, the original game's Bananas Gorilla activity and song and Junior Seesaw activity was removed (the latter due to being redundant in comparison to the main Seesaw activity). Everything else from the DOS version was carried over to the remake.

Reception
Computer Gaming World in January 1994 liked the graphics "in spite of some choppiness in the animation. Richard Scarry's characters are faithfully reproduced". The magazine concluded that "Busytown is a must-have if there's a young child in the house". In April 1994 the magazine said that "Busytown is playful learning at its best".

References

1993 video games
1999 video games
DOS games
Children's educational video games
North America-exclusive video games
Sega Genesis games
Sega video games
Single-player video games
Video games developed in Hungary
Video games developed in the United States
Video games based on television series
Video games based on adaptations